Nehama Ronen (born 15 September 1961) is a former Israeli politician who served as a member of the Knesset for the Centre Party between 2001 and 2003.

Biography
Ronen studied education and history at Tel Aviv University, gaining a B.Ed. She also studied towards an MA in public administration at the University of Haifa and worked as an administrator. In June 1996 she was appointed Director General of the Ministry of Environmental Protection, a post she held until June 1999.

For the May 1999 Knesset elections she was placed seventh on the Centre Party list, but missed out on a seat when they won only six mandates. However, she entered the Knesset on 8 March 2001 as a replacement for Amnon Lipkin-Shahak. Prior to the 2003 elections she joined Likud, but was only placed 54th on the party's list, resulting in her losing her seat.

After leaving politics, she returned to her position as chairwoman at Maman Cargo Terminals and Handling in 2004, having previously held the post between 1999 and 2001. She also became chairwoman of ELA recycling and was a director at Bank Hapoalim.

References

External links

1961 births
Living people
Tel Aviv University alumni
Israeli civil servants
Women members of the Knesset
Centre Party (Israel) politicians
Likud politicians
Members of the 15th Knesset (1999–2003)
21st-century Israeli women politicians
20th-century Israeli women politicians